Parabaryssinus lineaticollis is a species of beetle in the family Cerambycidae, the only species in the genus Parabaryssinus.

References

Acanthocinini